Daniel Kvande (born 8 April 1995) is a Norwegian footballer who plays in defender for Ranheim.

Career
Kvande started his career at Rosenborg as a junior, he then moved to Byåsen in 2013. Kvande signed with Ranheim in 2015.

Kvande made his debut for Ranheim in Eliteserien in a 4-1 win against Stabæk.

Career statistics

References

1995 births
Living people
Footballers from Trondheim
Norwegian footballers
Norway youth international footballers
Byåsen Toppfotball players
Ranheim Fotball players
Norwegian First Division players
Eliteserien players
Association football defenders